Vuk Mitošević (born 12 February 1991) is a Serbian footballer who plays in Kazakhstan for Shakhter Karagandy.

External links
 Profile at Srbijafudbal.
 Vuk Mitošević Stats at Utakmica.rs
 

1991 births
Living people
Footballers from Novi Sad
Serbian footballers
Association football midfielders
Serbia under-21 international footballers
Serbia youth international footballers
FK Palić players
FK Vojvodina players
FK Jagodina players
Serbian SuperLiga players
Kazakhstan Premier League players
Serbian expatriate footballers
Expatriate footballers in Kazakhstan
Serbian expatriate sportspeople in Kazakhstan
FC Kaisar players
FC Aktobe players
FK Radnik Surdulica players
Kisvárda FC players
FC Shakhter Karagandy players
Nemzeti Bajnokság I players
Expatriate footballers in Hungary
Serbian expatriate sportspeople in Hungary